Kinuso is a hamlet in northern Alberta, Canada within Big Lakes County, and surrounded by the Swan River First Nation reserve.

The name Kinuso comes from the Cree word  'fish'.

Kinuso was incorporated as a village until it dissolved on September 1, 2009.

Demographics 

See also 
List of communities in Alberta
List of former urban municipalities in Alberta
List of hamlets in Alberta

References 

Big Lakes County
Designated places in Alberta
Former villages in Alberta
Hamlets in Alberta
Populated places disestablished in 2009